Geraldine O'Rawe (born 4 March 1971) is an Irish actress.

O'Rawe was born in Belfast, Northern Ireland. She studied at the Webber Douglas Academy of Dramatic Art in London in 1989 and made her television debut in the series Final Run in 1988. She returned to the London stage, then appeared in an episode of The Young Indiana Jones Chronicles and the TV movie The English Wife.

She was cast in the role of Eve Malone in the 1995 film Circle of Friends alongside Minnie Driver and Saffron Burrows. She followed this in 1996 with the lead role in the film Mariette In Ecstasy and a supporting role in Some Mother's Son. Since then, she has appeared in Resurrection Man (1996), The Harpist (1999), Disco Pigs (2000), Mr In-Between (2001) and Adoration (2008).

She is married to the Canadian director and cinematographer Paul Sarossy.

Selected filmography

References

External links
 

1971 births
Living people
Film actresses from Northern Ireland
Alumni of the Webber Douglas Academy of Dramatic Art
Actresses from Belfast